Bring Us the Bright is an album by American jazz fusion group Snarky Puppy that was released in 2008.

Track listing

Personnel
Source: 
 Michael League – bass guitar, double bass, vocals
 Mike Maher – trumpet, vocals
 Sara Jacovino – trombone, vocals (Tracks 1,2,3,6 & 7) 
 Clay Pritchard – tenor saxophone (Track 6)
 Chris Bullock – tenor saxophone (Tracks 1,2,3,4,6 & 7) 
 Brian Donohoe – tenor saxophone, alto saxophone, vocals (Tracks 1,2,3,6 & 7) 
 Mark Lettieri – electric guitar (Track 3)
 Chris McQueen – electric guitar, acoustic guitar, vocals
 Bob Lanzetti – electric guitar, vocals
 William Barnes – pedal steel guitar, dobro (Track 1)
 "Leftthand" Kevin Williams – bass (Track 2)
 Bernard Wright– keyboards (Tracks 3,5,6 & 7)
 Bobby Sparks – keyboards (Tracks 2,3,5,6 & 7)
 Bill Laurance – keyboards, piano, vocals
 Justin Stanton – keyboards (tracks 1,5 & 6), trumpet (Tracks 1,2,3,5,6,7 & 8) 
 Zach Brock – violin (Tracks 1,4 & 8)
 Veronika Vassileva – viola (Tracks 1,4 & 8)
 Michelle Cho – cello (Tracks 1,4 & 8)
 Robert Searight – drums, keyboards (Tracks 1,2,3,5 & 7)
 Steve Pruitt – drums, vocals (Tracks 1,2,4,5,7 & 8)
 Nate Werth – percussion
 Jorge Ginorio – percussion (Track 2)
 José Aponte – percussion, vocals (Track 2)
 Mikal Evans – vocals (Track 1)
 Michelle Aponte – vocals (Track 2)
 Jomar Ginorio – "kid noises" (Track 2)

References

2008 albums
Snarky Puppy albums